For the One Life to Live character, see Austin Buchanan (One Life to Live)

Austin Buchanan (born 22 May 1984) is a professional rugby league footballer for Dewsbury.

Buchanan started playing at age 14 at Milford and went on to play for Leeds (Academy), York City Knights (two spells), Castleford Tigers, London Broncos and Wakefield Trinity Wildcats (Heritage № 1229).  He was twice an Academy Winner with Leeds, a National League Two Grand Final runner-up with York and the following year won promotion from National League Two with York.

According to the Dewsbury website, 2008 marks Buchanan's second year with Dewsbury and he "looks to have pretty much secured his place in the first team."

He is the half-brother of Leeds and Great Britain international Jamie Jones-Buchanan.

References

External links
(archived by web.archive.org) Dewsbury Rams player profiles - Dewsbury.rugbyleague.org
Statistics at rugbyleagueproject.org
Wildcats squad: Austin Buchanan - YorkshirePost.co.uk

1984 births
Living people
Dewsbury Rams players
English rugby league players
London Broncos players
Rugby league players from Leeds
Wakefield Trinity players
York City Knights players
Rugby league wingers